This is a timeline of Amazon history, which dates back at least 11,000 years ago, when humans left indications of their presence in Caverna da Pedra Pintada.

Here is a brief timeline of historical events in the Amazon River valley.

Pre-Columbian Era
 c.500-1400: The Casarabe culture flourishes in Bolivia

11th century to 19th century
 1000: Island of Marajó flourishes as an Amazonian ceramic center
 1494: Europeans create the Treaty of Tordesillas, which divides Spanish and Portuguese claims to new territories. South America falls almost entirely to Spain. The line runs N-S some 100 km E of Belém, Brazil.
 1498: Christopher Columbus enters the Orinoco River estuary in present-day Venezuela
 1500: Vicente Yáñez Pinzón sails into the Amazon estuary.
 1500: Portuguese navigator Pedro Álvares Cabral, en route to the Orient, discovers Brazil, landing in Bahia.
 1541–1542 – First descent of the Amazon by Francisco de Orellana (ca. 1511–1546) from Quito, Ecuador, via the Rio Napo to the Atlantic Ocean. He fights Indigenous women he calls "Amazons." The name sticks to the river. Expedition chronicled by friar Gaspar de Carvajal.
 1560–1561 – Second descent of the Amazon, this time by the conquistador Lope de Aguirre.
 1595 – Sir Walter Raleigh leads expedition to colonize the Orinoco River for the English. In 1616, he settles for Trinidad.
 1616 – Founding of Santa Maria do Grão Pará de Belém, Brazil, to mark Portuguese presence. The French, English, and even Irish try to colonize the region.
 1619 - Founding of the settlement of Borja on the banks of the Marañón River in Peru. 
 1637–1639 – Pedro Teixeira leads the first European expedition up the Amazon from Belém to Quito, arriving unexpected.
 1638 - First Jesuit mission founded at Borja, Peru in Mainas region on the banks of the Marañón River. 
 1726 – Francisco Xavier de Moraes, ascending the Rio Negro, discovers the Casiquiare canal to the Orinoco.
 1736 – Charles Marie de La Condamine sends first rubber sample to Europe from his Amazon expedition.
 1750 – Treaty of Madrid fixes boundaries between the Spanish and Portuguese empires in South America. Portuguese possession of areas west of the Tordesillas line is recognized, based on occupation.
 1759 – Jesuits are expelled from Brazil by the Marquis of Pombal. Indians left without protection.
 1799 – Alexander von Humboldt explores the Orinoco and proves the link via the Casiquiare canal to the Rio Negro. Humboldt refused permission to enter Brazil.
 1808–1825 – Spanish rule in South America ends with revolutions led by Simón Bolívar of Venezuela, San Martín of Argentina, and O'Higgins of Chile. In 1808 the Portuguese royal family arrives in Brazil escaping the Napoleon's invasion of Portugal.
 1818–1820 – Spix and Martius on expedition in the Amazon.
 1822 – Brazil proclaims its independence under Dom Pedro I of Brazil.
 1823 – Charles Macintosh invents waterproof rubber cape.
 1826–1828 – Baron von Langsdorff on expedition from Cuiabá to Belém, arriving with sanity impaired.
 1826–1828 – Cabanagem revolt in Belém and Manaus, with 40,000 fatalities.
 1826-1833 - Alcide Charles Victor d'Orbigny conducts a scientific tour of South America, including the Amazon valley.
 1827-1832 - Eduard Friedrich Poeppig conducts a scientific exploration through Chile, Peru, and the upper Amazon.
 1834-1835 - British naval officers William Smyth and Frederick Lowe travel from Lima, Peru across the Andes and down the entire length of the Amazon, seeking a navigable route for trade from the west coast of South America to the east. They publish their account in 1836.
 1839 – Charles Goodyear invents vulcanization of rubber which becomes an important component of the Industrial Revolution.
 1839–1842 – Brothers Robert and Richard Schomburgk on expedition in northern Brazil.
 1842 – Prince Adalbert of Prussia on the Xingu River.
 1842-1845—Tardy de Montravel conducts a mapping expedition of the northern coast of Brazil and 1000 km up the lower Amazon.
 1846 – François Louis de la Porte, comte de Castelnau on the Araguaia and Tocantins Rivers.
 1846 - William Henry Edwards, an American businessman and amateur entomologist, voyages up the Amazon and publishes his account in 1847, which was read by and inspired Bates and Wallace to go to Brazil the following year.
 1848–1859 – Henry Walter Bates and Alfred Russel Wallace in the Amazon. (Wallace leaves in 1852.)
 1849–1864 – Spruce, of cinchona fame, in the Amazon. He gets the quinine tree seeds in 1860.
 1850 – Manaus is new capital of Amazonas province.
 1850–1915 – Rubber boom sucks tens of thousands of immigrants into the Amazon, mostly from the drought-stricken northeast of Brazil. 
 1851–1852 – Lieutenant William Lewis Herndon and Lieutenant Lardner Gibbon (U.S. Navy) on the Amazon to Belém.
 1858 – Peru gains rights to navigation on the Amazon River.
 1860s - William Chandless conducts expeditions on the Southern tributaries of the Amazon for the Royal Geographical Society.
 1861-1863—João Martins da Silva Coutinho travels through the rubber harvesting areas of the Amazon valley and later accompanies Louis Agassiz.
 1865–1866 – Biologist Louis Agassiz and geologist Charles F. Hartt on expedition in the Amazon.
 1866 – Founding of the Goeldi Museum of Natural History in Belém by Domingos Soares Ferreira Penna and others. Agassiz had given stimulus to this when he was in the Amazon.
 1867 – Amazon River opened to international shipping.
 1867 – Confederate expatriates settle in Santarém, after U.S. Civil War.
 1867 - Franz Keller-Leuzinger surveys the possibility of routing a railroad along the Madeira River to link Peru to Amazon commerce.
 1867 - American James Orton travels from Quito Ecuador to the Amazon via the Napo River and later writes an account of his trip.
 1870-1871 - Morgan Expedition led by Charles F. Hartt and assisted by student Herbert Huntington Smith conducts a geological and zoological survey of the northern Amazon valley.
 1873 - James Orton returns to Brazil and travels along the Amazon east from Belem to Lima, Peru.
 1874 - Theatro da Paz opens in the city of Belem
 1874-1878 -- Herbert Huntington Smith collected specimens based in Santarem, and later joins Charles F. Hartt to make surveys for the Brazilian Geological Survey.
 1875-1876—American teenager Ernest Morris makes the first of his six trips to the Amazon valley to collect butterflies, beetles, and orchids for American collectors. His later trips were detailed in a series of columns for the "New York World".
 1876 – Henry Wickham takes some 70,000 rubber tree seeds to Kew Gardens in England.
 1879 - Herbert Huntington Smith returns to Brazil to write a series of popular travel narratives for "Scribners Magazine", later expanded into a book.
 1888 – Dunlop invents the rubber tube tire.
 1895 – International arbitration forces Venezuela to cede large area still disputed with Guyana.
 1895–1899 – Henri Coudreau and Octavie Coudreau explore Amazon waterways of Pará.
 1897 – Manaus' Teatro Amazonas (opera house) opens. Rubber booming.
 1899–1903 – Acre proclaims itself independent of Bolivia. In 1901, Bolivia cedes rights to Acre to New York rubber syndicate. In 1903, Acre becomes Brazilian by the Treaty of Petrópolis, in which Bolivia is promised a railroad link to the Madeira River at Porto Velho.

20th century
 1907: Madeira-Mamoré Railroad is built by Americans under Percival Farquar. Colonel Church's attempts in 1870–1881 are best called disasters made heroic by tragedy.
 1908–1911: Henry Ford, then the richest person in the world, invests in Amazon rubber plantations on the Tapajós River.
 1908–1911: Arana's rubber company on the Putamayo River is denounced for atrocities against Indians. English parliamentary inquiry in 1910. (Arana dies in 1952 in Lima after serving as Peruvian senator.)
 1912: After other countries stealing seedlings from Brazil, rubber from Malaysia exceeds that coming out of the Amazon.
 1913: Former US president Theodore Roosevelt and Brazilian Field Marshal Cândido Rondon on Amazon expedition down the River of Doubt (now the Roosevelt River) (Roosevelt, 1919).
 1914: Rubber boom bursts with the emergence of cheaper sources of rubber.
 1922: Salomón-Lozano Treaty awards Leticia to Colombia, as an outlet to the Amazon River. In 1933, Peru seizes Leticia but backs down under international pressure, and in 1935 Leticia is reoccupied by Colombia.
 1925: Colonel Percy Fawcett vanishes near the headwaters of the Xingu River. His eyeglasses are later found among the Kayapó Indians of the Xingu River valley.
 1942: Brazil enters World War II. Demand is high for Amazon rubber. Brazil launches the ill-fated "Rubber Soldiers" program.
 1947: Cerro Bolívar, iron ore deposit south of Puerto Ordaz, Venezuela, is found and estimated at half a billion tons of high-grade ore. Puerto Ordaz is selected in 1953 as site for steel mill and huge hydroelectric plant.
 1960: Brasilia, as new capital of Brazil, is founded.
 1962: Belém-Brasília Highway opens as first major all-year Amazon highway, linking Amazon River port city of Belém with the rest of Brazil.
 1967: Iron ore deposit at Serra dos Carajás is discovered in the eastern Brazilian Amazon. High quality ore (66% iron) is estimated at 18 billion tons.
 1967–1983: American businessman Daniel K. Ludwig invests heavily in Jari wood pulp and lumber plantation. His losses would amount to over 500 million dollars.
 1974: Manaus-Porto Velho highway opens.
 1980: Gold deposit at Serra Pelada is discovered. By 1986, an estimated 42 tons of gold are extracted from giant pit mine. Amazon gold rush is in full swing. In 1987 striking gold miners would be machine-gunned when they seize the railroad bridge at Marabá.
 1982: First person to navigate the origin on the Amazon Kayaker Caril Ridley, sponsored by the Cousteau Foundation, Cousteau Amazon Expedition, https://en.wikipedia.org/wiki/Nevado_Mismi.
 1984: Tucuruí hydroelectric dam is inaugurated, guaranteeing energy to the country.
 1996: Renewed military presence seen in the Amazon region of Brazil, as a result of radar project and militarization of the borders against drug traffic. Secret project SIVAM is revealed.

21st century
 2005: Worst drought in 50 years hits the western Amazon Basin. 
 2010: Drought hits Amazon Rainforest.
 2013: Using data accumulated over 10 years, researchers estimate there are 390 billion trees in the Amazon rainforest, divided into 16,000 different species.

Notes

External links
Scientists find Evidence Discrediting Theory Amazon was Virtually Unlivable by The Washington Post

 
Amazonia
Amazon
Amazon